Adam Soliman is the director of The Fisheries Law Centre. He is a researcher focused on legal and economic issues in Fisheries.  He teaches fisheries law in several countries and advocates for further access to justice in small-scale fisheries. He researches and conducts analysis to issues in fisheries management with special focus on small-scale fisheries. He specializes in fisheries management scheme and property rights particularly in catch shares and other management schemes.

He started his career in the agribusiness sector, working for a family operation in the Middle East. He holds a BSc and MSc. in Agricultural Economics. He also had Juris Doctor from the University of Hong Kong and an LL.M.  in Agriculture and Food Law from the University of Arkansas.

Adam Soliman asserts the importance of including fisheries law in law school curriculums. He describes the access to justice gap in fisheries and coastal communities as three intertwined issues: lack of education; lack of legal research and lack of advocacy.

Academic publications

 Ecoterrorism and the Reinterpretation of Piracy: The Sea Shepherd Case, forthcoming 2014
 Duty of Stewardship and Fisheries Governance: A Proposed Framework, forthcoming 2014
 Does private property rights promote sustainability? Examining Individual Transferable Quotas in Fisheries”, Seattle Journal of Environmental Law, forthcoming in May 2014
 Using Individual Transferable Quotas (ITQs) To Achieve Social Policy Objectives: A Proposed Intervention, Marine Policy 45C (2014), pp. 76–81
 Individual Transferable Quotas in World Fisheries: Addressing Legal and Rights-Based Issues, Ocean and Coastal Management Journal, Volume 87, January 2014, Pages 102–113
 Property Rights and Individual Transferable Quotas in the U.S.: A Legal Overview, Newsletter on Climate Change, Sustainability Development, and Ecosystems, American Bar Association, April 2013
 Nanotechnology Regulation in Hong Kong: A Comparative Legal Study, publication forthcoming, City University of Hong Kong Law Review, vol 4(1), 2013
 ITQs and Fisheries Management: Policy Risk in Canadian Sablefish, in 2012: New Rules of Trade?, International Agricultural Trade Research Consortium, 2012
 Global Solutions for Biofuel Certification Schemes: A Comparative Analysis”, City University of Hong Kong Law Review, vol 2(3), 2012
 Impacts of ITQs in Canadian Sablefish Fisheries: An Economic Analysis, M.Sc. Thesis, University of British Columbia, 2010

Book chapters
 Adapting ITQs To Support Small Scale Fisheries: Alaska's Community Development Quota Program for Halibut and Sablefish, in Governing the Governance, planned to be published within the MARE Series at Springer in 2015
 Stewardship as a Legal Duty, in Enhancing the Stewardship, Too Big To Ignore Working Group 4, forthcoming 2015

Selected non-academic articles
 Hong Kong Offers a Growing Opportunity to Australia's Food Producers, Hong Kong Business, July 2013
 Genetically Engineered Salmon: Can Producers be Required to Label it?, IntraFish, April 2013
 Why Canadian Agriculture Economics Programs Should Offer Agriculture and Food Law Courses, Newsletter, Canadian Agricultural Economics Society, March 2013
 Seafood Markets and Their Potential, Fish Info & Services, March 2013
 Maintaining a Rich Seafood Market in Hong Kong, Hong Kong Business, March 2013
 Can Social Media Enhance Food Safety?, Food Safety News, January 2013
 Wet Markets in China: A Food Safety Perspective, Food Safety News, December 2012
 Do Nanomaterials Pose Health Risks? What Science Has to Say, Food Safety News, November 2012
 Halal: More Than A Niche, Food Safety News, October 2012
 The Need For Stronger Nanotechnology Regulations, Food Safety News, October 2012

Law Update
 Senior Editor, Fisheries Law Update (quarterly publication commenced June 2013)

See also
 The Fisheries Law Centre
 Fisheries Law
 Fisheries Management

References

External links
 The Fisheries Law Centre's Website

Fisheries scientists
Living people
Year of birth missing (living people)
21st-century Canadian zoologists